In the mathematics of binary relations, the composition of relations is the forming of a new binary relation  from two given binary relations R and S. In the calculus of relations, the composition of relations is called relative multiplication, and its result is called a relative product. Function composition is the special case of composition of relations where all relations involved are functions.

The word uncle indicates a compound relation: for a person to be an uncle, he must be the brother of a parent. In algebraic logic it is said that the relation of Uncle is the composition of relations "is a brother of" and "is a parent of".

Beginning with Augustus De Morgan, the traditional form of reasoning by syllogism has been subsumed by relational logical expressions and their composition.

Definition

their composition  is the relation

In other words,  is defined by the rule that says  if and only if there is an element  such that  (that is,   and ).

Notational variations

The semicolon as an infix notation for composition of relations dates back to Ernst Schroder's textbook of 1895. Gunther Schmidt has renewed the use of the semicolon, particularly in Relational Mathematics (2011). The use of semicolon coincides with the notation for function composition used (mostly by computer scientists) in category theory, as well as the notation for dynamic conjunction within linguistic dynamic semantics.

A small circle  has been used for the infix notation of composition of relations by John M. Howie in his books considering semigroups of relations. However, the small circle is widely used to represent composition of functions  which reverses the text sequence from the operation sequence. The small circle was used in the introductory pages of Graphs and Relations until it was dropped in favor of juxtaposition (no infix notation). Juxtaposition  is commonly used in algebra to signify multiplication, so too, it can signify relative multiplication.

Further with the circle notation, subscripts may be used. Some authors prefer to write  and  explicitly when necessary, depending whether the left or the right relation is the first one applied. A further variation encountered in computer science is the Z notation:  is used to denote the traditional (right) composition, but ⨾ denotes left composition.

The binary relations  are sometimes regarded as the morphisms  in a category Rel which has the sets as objects. In Rel, composition of morphisms is exactly composition of relations as defined above. The category Set of sets is a subcategory of Rel that has the same objects but fewer morphisms.

Properties

 Composition of relations is associative: 
 The composition of (partial) functions (that is, functional relations) is again a (partial) function.

Composition in terms of matrices

Finite binary relations are represented by logical matrices. The entries of these matrices are either zero or one, depending on whether the relation represented is false or true for the row and column corresponding to compared objects. Thus the logical matrix of a composition of relations can be found by computing the matrix product of the matrices representing the factors of the composition. "Matrices constitute a method for computing the conclusions traditionally drawn by means of hypothetical syllogisms and sorites."

Heterogeneous relations

If for all  there exists some  such that  (that is,  is a (left-)total relation), then for all  so that  is a reflexive relation or  where I is the identity relation  Similarly, if  is a surjective relation then 
 
In this case  The opposite inclusion occurs for a difunctional relation.

The composition  is used to distinguish relations of Ferrer's type, which satisfy

Example

Let  { France, Germany, Italy, Switzerland } and  { French, German, Italian } with the relation  given by  when  is a national language of 

The converse relation  corresponds to the transposed matrix, and the relation composition  corresponds to the matrix product  when summation is implemented by logical disjunction. It turns out that the  matrix  contains a 1 at every position, while the reversed matrix product computes as:

This matrix is symmetric, and represents a homogeneous relation on 

Correspondingly,  is the universal relation on  hence any two languages share a nation where they both are spoken (in fact: Switzerland).
Vice versa, the question whether two given nations share a language can be answered using

Schröder rules

For a given set  the collection of all binary relations on  forms a Boolean lattice ordered by inclusion  Recall that complementation reverses inclusion:
 
In the calculus of relations it is common to represent the complement of a set by an overbar: 

If  is a binary relation, let  represent the converse relation, also called the transpose. Then the Schröder rules are

Verbally, one equivalence can be obtained from another: select the first or second factor and transpose it; then complement the other two relations and permute them.

Though this transformation of an inclusion of a composition of relations was detailed by Ernst Schröder, in fact Augustus De Morgan first articulated the transformation as Theorem K in 1860. He wrote 

With Schröder rules and complementation one can solve for an unknown relation  in relation inclusions such as 

Quotients

Just as composition of relations is a type of multiplication resulting in a product, so some operations compare to division and produce quotients. Three quotients are exhibited here: left residual, right residual, and symmetric quotient. The left residual of two relations is defined presuming that they have the same domain (source), and the right residual presumes the same codomain (range, target). The symmetric quotient presumes two relations share a domain and a codomain.

Definitions:
 Left residual: 
 Right residual: 
 Symmetric quotient: 

One can practice the logic of residuals with Sudoku.

Join: another form of composition

The usual composition of two binary relations as defined here can be obtained by taking their join, leading to a ternary relation, followed by a projection that removes the middle component. For example, in the query language SQL there is the operation Join (SQL).

See also

Notes

References

 M. Kilp, U. Knauer, A.V. Mikhalev (2000) Monoids, Acts and Categories with Applications to Wreath Products and Graphs, De Gruyter Expositions in Mathematics vol. 29, Walter de Gruyter,.

Algebraic logic
Binary operations
Mathematical relations